Jaan Teemant's third cabinet was in office in Estonia from 4 March 1927 to 9 December 1927, when it was succeeded by Jaan Tõnisson's third cabinet.

Members

This cabinet's members were the following:

References

Cabinets of Estonia